Takuyo-Daisan is a guyot in the Western Pacific Ocean off Japan. Several other seamounts lie nearby.

The seamount formed as a volcanic island during the Cretaceous in the area currently occupied by French Polynesia. Subsequently reefs developed around the volcanic island and generated a carbonate platform which drowned during the Albian along with several other such platforms in the world.

Name and research history 
Takuyo-Daisan was formerly known as "Seiko guyot"; "Seiko guyot" was used even earlier for Takuyo-Daini while Takuyo-Daisan was named "Eiko". This seamount was drilled by the Ocean Drilling Program, with Site 879 located on the seamount.

Geography and geology 
Takuyo-Daisan lies southeast of the city of Yokohama, Japan. It is the easternmost seamount in the "Seiko" cluster of the Japanese Seamounts.

Local 
It may be either a bioherm or a karst landform. A - high structure may be part of the old volcanic edifice; the interface between the carbonate platform and the volcanic basement has a sloping aspect.

Channels, debris flow fronts and levees decorate its slopes. Noticeable ridges emanate from the east-southeastern, southwestern, west-northwestern and north-northeastern corners of the seamount; they appear to be rift zones, and flank cones are found on the eastern slopes. The southern slopes feature slump deposits, and the entire seamount is surrounded by a sediment fan. Two large seamounts lie west and southwest of Takuyo-Daisan with a smaller seamount between the two; Takuyo-Daini is the western one and Jensen seamount the south-western one. The seafloor underneath Takuyo-Daisan has an age of 143 million years.

Regional 
They were considered to be remnants of eroded islands before Cretaceous carbonate platforms were discovered on them which resemble present-day atolls although they do not have exactly the same properties. Later similar submarine mountains were identified elsewhere in the Pacific Ocean as well. Menard 1958 suggested that the Western Pacific guyots once were part of an elevated region known as the Darwin Rise, later compared to present day French Polynesia.

Many of these seamounts originally formed in the South Pacific, such as in French Polynesia, where a number of recent volcanoes and volcanic chains can be found. The original location of Takuyo-Daisan closely matches the present-day location of the Society hotspot, and together with Takuyo-Daini, Winterer Guyot and Isakov Guyot appears to form a linear volcanic chain, the Geisha guyots.

Composition 
Takuyo-Daisan has erupted basalt containing olivine and plagioclase and which define an intermediary to tholeiitic magma suite. Weathering of volcanic rocks has given rise to calcite, clay which also contains coal, iddingsite and zeolite. Carbonates occur in the form of floatstone, grainstone, limestone, packstone, oncoids, peloids, rudstone and wackestone; the limestone is of reefal origin. Hypersthene andesite samples taken from Takuyo-Daisan were probably brought there by ice rafting as no such rocks have ever been found on this kind of volcanic island.

Geologic history

Volcanism 
Obtaining reliable radiometric ages from Takuyo-Daisan has been difficult; the most reliable age has been obtained from nearby Takuyo-Daini, 118.4 ± 1.8 million years ago. From this date an age of 119.0 ± 1.8 million years ago has been inferred for Takuyo-Daisan. A more recent date from Takuyo-Daisan is 117.5 ± 1.1 million years ago. The seamount formed at 9-7 degrees south from the equator.

Phreatomagmatic deposits and rocks interpreted as peperite have also been found, implying that some lava flows may have interacted with wet soils as they were emplaced.

Carbonate sedimentation 
Carbonate sedimentation at Takyuo-Daisan lasted from the Aptian to the Albian (based on foraminiferal fossils) and led to the deposition of about - of carbonate sediment. Carbonate sedimentation took place while the initial volcanic edifice was still emergent, similar to present-day Truk, Micronesia; this resulted in terrigenous sedimentation in the carbonates.

The carbonate platform at Takuyo-Daisan featured both barrier shoals and lagoonal environments. Biogenic mounds grew at the margin of the platform. Redeposition of carbonate sediments led to the formation of sandy shoals which formed the later perimeter ridge. Overall the environment of the platform was a warm Tethyan environment.

Algae including algal mats, bivalves, corals, cyanobacteria, echinoids, foraminifera, molluscs, nannofossil-forming species and rudists inhabited the carbonate platform, and arthropods and woods have been found in the oldest carbonate deposits. The fauna of Takuyo-Daisan was not particularly diverse, probably because the seamount was located close to the paleoequator and away from the Tethyan margin that many species found at Takuyo-Daisan originate from.

Drowning and post-drowning evolution 
The drowning of the carbonate platform at Takuyo-Daisan has been attributed to different causes. A large transgression took place in the late Albian and may have caused the drowning. In other guyots nutrient excess has been implicated but there is no evidence of such at Takuyo-Daisan. Other factors may include hostile conditions close to the equator and unfavourable changes of the geomorphology of the platform at the time of its drowning. The drowning of the Takuyo-Daisan platform was simultaneous to the drowning of carbonate platforms elsewhere around the world and may have been caused by tectonically-induced sea level fluctuations.

After cessation of the platform activity, manganese crusts and chalks later modified by phosphate developed on exposed rocks. During the Neogene, oozes, terrigenous sediments, wind-borne material such as pollen and volcanic ash from the approaching Japanese volcanic arc accumulated on Takuyo-Daisan.

Presently, Takuyo-Daisan lies in a region of high plankton productivity which has led to a high diatom deposition rate as well as high sedimentation rates in general. Corals and sponges have been found on the seamount; crinoids may also occur there.

Notes

References

Bibliography 

 
 
 
 
 
 
 
 
 
 
 
 

Seamounts of the Pacific Ocean
Cretaceous volcanoes
Geography of Japan